There are 53 curazie in San Marino.

List

References 

Curazie in San Marino
San Marino
curazie